The 1972 CONCACAF Champions' Cup was the 8th edition of the annual international club football competition held in the CONCACAF region (North America, Central America and the Caribbean), the CONCACAF Champions' Cup. It determined that year's club champion of association football in the CONCACAF region and was played from 29 October 1971 till 31 January 1972 under the home/away match system.

The tournament was split into 2 zones (North, Central American and Caribbean), each one qualifying the winner to the final tournament. CD Olimpia from Honduras won the final, and became for the first time in its history CONCACAF champion.

North/Central American Zone
Unknown if clubs from: Costa Rica El Salvador Guatemala United Statesentered the tournament.

First round
Earlier results and matches unavailable.Eliminated participants apparently included: América Deportivo Santa Cecilia Unión Española
 Olimpia qualified for semifinal.

Toluca advances to the semifinal.

Caribbean Zone

First round

Robinhood advances to the second round.

Don Bosco apparently won; results unknown. Advances to the second round.

Second round

Robinhood, won presumably by withdrawal and advanced to the CONCACAF Final.

Semifinal

 Olimpia won 2–1 on aggregate.

Final

First leg

Second leg 

 Olimpia won 1–0 on aggregate.

Champion

References

1
CONCACAF Champions' Cup